Psycho-Pass 3 is a 2019 anime series in the Psycho-Pass franchise that serves as a direct sequel to the 2014 series Psycho-Pass 2  and aired in Japan's Fuji TV's Noitamina from October 24 to December 12, 2019. It was first revealed in March 2019. Besides featuring characters from previous series, Psycho-Pass and Psycho-Pass 2, the anime focuses on new characters including Yūki Kaji's Arata Shindo and Yūichi Nakamura's Kei Mikhail Ignatov with Akira Amano having conceived their designs. Naoyoshi Shiotani returns to direct the series at Production I.G. Set in a dystopian future where society is overseen by technology known as the Sibyl System, the story focuses on Shindo and Ignatov, two policemen.

Director Naoyoshi Shiotani conceived the series in 2015 when coming up with a Psycho-Pass series that primarily relies on a new cast. Much attention was provided to the new main duo a well as the series' social commentary in regards to immigrants in Japan. The series was adapted into a manga and was followed by the movie sequel Psycho-Pass 3: First Inspector (2020) which closes the main arc. Critical response to the series was largely positive for the handling of several themes and dynamic of Shindo and Ignatov.

Plot
The Public Safety Bureau assigns newly-appointed agents, Arata Shindo and Kei Mikhail Ignatov, to Unit One now led by Mika Shimotsuki. The Enforcers, consisting of Tenma Todoroki, Kazumichi Irie, Mao Kisaragi, and Sho Hinakawa, meet them and are surprised by how Arata is able to investigate people through his Mental Trace. During the story, Unit One investigates a case involving idol Karina Komiya who is voted as the new Governor of Tokyo. As they track criminals trying to kill her, Unit One meet the Suppressing Action Department of the Foreign Affairs Operations Department, a branch overseeing international crimes such as smuggling and terrorism. Led by Frederica Hanashiro, the Ministry give the protagonists information about criminals labeled as foxes from the secret criminal organization Bifrost.

During the investigation of a cult, Ignatov and Kisarage are kidnapped by its leader, who is the son of a Bifrost member. Ignatov's  wife, Maiko Maya Stronskaya, is taken hostage too. As the leader aims to exploit Ignatov, he is instead murdered by Maiko. This causes Maiko to become a latent criminal and is kept hidden from her life. In the outcome, Bifrost is reduced to three members who have been plotting against each other too with Shindo's late father revealed to be one of them. Unit One joins forces with the Ministry to stop Bifrost and Shindo is chosen as Komiya's bodyguard, fearing her to be the next target. Ignatov meets Shizuka Homura from Bifrost who offers his wife's recovery at the cost of his aid. Meanwhile, former inspector Akane Tsunemori remains imprisoned for an unknown crime but claims that she chose Shindo as her successor to solve a crime as both of them are immune to the Sybil System's value. The series ends on a cliffhanger as Koichi Azusawa from Bifrost arranges a car accident to attack former Unit One member Yayoi Kunizuka. The series' plot continues in the film Psycho-Pass 3: First Inspector.

Production

Director Naoyoshi Shiotani came up with the idea of Psycho Pass 3 in 2015 after productions of the series' 2015 film, Psycho-Pass: The Movie, was made. The director claimed the franchise should use new characters for the sequel Psycho-Pass 3 and the 2018 film trilogy Psycho-Pass: Sinners of the System was created to fill gap between the movie and the third television series. The trilogy was also a test case for Psycho-Pass 3 in terms of production. Shiotani entrusted the writers Tow Ubukata, Makoto Fukami and Ryō Yoshigami with handling the new cast. Fukami and Yoshikami wrote the script while Ubukata was in charge of the composition. Fukami was surprised with the ongoing dynamic between Shiotani and Ubukata as despite the new story sharing a new cast, the series still felt like Psycho-Pass.

Scenario and themes
He clarified that every episode of the new series should be based on a different theme based on Ubukata's writing and there are a few characters not included in the original series composition that were added later on. Special attention was given to Shindo's characterization because he could easily come across as an unlikable character based on how he controls conversations but is also still caring. Ubukata wanted the two main characters to be written solely by Fukami. Since it was composed of three parts, economics, politics, and religion, the acoustic staff said, "Each one is like a movie version." Shiotani was able to create a composition with three themes and stick to the acoustic composition that can only be achieved with the 60-minute format. The sound team gave us finish on a tight schedule. Although the series is centered in a future Japan, Shiotani wanted to depict the issues from the modern Japan, most notably the poor treatment given to immigrants.

Yūki Kaji voiced Shindo in the series. Upon seeing his character for the first time, Kaji found him stylish. Kaji was overjoyed when he got the role of Shindo during the audition, having watched the previous Psycho-Pass works and being a fan of them. Kaji enjoyed the character's relationship with Ignatov due to their close relationship and Shindo's style of interacting with the characters from previous seasons. Kaji laughed when first reading the script because he found the cast unique and looked forward to the characters' growth during the series. He had mixed feelings about Shindo wielding the Dominator due to the violence it can cause.

Ignatov's voice actor, Yūichi Nakamura, also enjoyed the dynamic between Shindo and his character and wished the two were brothers. The handling of the characters' relationships with their underlings also appealed to him. Nakamura had no clear understanding of Shindo and Ignatov because their pasts are not explored in the early episodes and he looked forward to the development of the series.

Release
The series was first announced in March 2019 by the official website of Psycho-Pass, claiming it would air on Fuji TV's Noitamina programming block. Outside of Japan, the series made its debut on Amazon Prime Video, revealing a total of eight episodes, each one being 45 minutes long.  

The opening theme is "Q-vism" by Who-ya Extended. Who-ya Extended was very proud that his work can be involved in these historical works as the theme song. He mentioned "Q-vism" gives mysterious feeling of gratitude and a sense of responsibility continues. He  sang with respect for the series that has been spun so far, and the expectations for this new work. Lastly, he envisioned determination into the feeling of loneliness and speed hoping to reach as many people as a possible. The ending theme is "bullet" by Cö shu Nie. Miku Nakamura from the band said she was a fan of Psycho-Pass herself and was honored to do thing theme. The rudder was held by themselves. They had a distorted "bullet" that can be released at any time.

The series was released in for DVD and Blu-ray volume from January 22 to April 15, 2020. A manga adaptation of the series written by Saru Hashino was serialized in Shueisha's Shonen Jump+ website and app from October 30, 2019 to August 28, 2021. A manga adaptation of the First Inspector was serialized in the same website and app from October 30, 2021 to July 30, 2022. Following the anime's cliffhanger finale, Production I.G produced a film, Psycho-Pass 3: First Inspector, released in 2020. The cast's image was used to produce clothing by the suit brand Difference, which is produced by Konaka Co.

Episode list

Home media release
Japanese

Reception
Psycho-Pass 3 has received better treatment than its immediate predecessor with focus given for the new characters and a script that tackled such modern day topics as immigration, corporate financial mismanagement and genetic manipulation. Despite being the third television series involving the Psycho-Pass series, Anime News Network found it accessible due to how the cast react to Sybil System while quickly establishing its status quo, finding the pilot "solid". Comic Book Resources regarded the series at delivering appealing sci-fi action to returning fans by delivering both new protagonists who stand out despite the fame of previous heroes. CinemaHolic enjoyed how the series focuses on multiple cases that appear to be connected while also exploring not only the new cast but also returning.

Ninotaku found him to be a well-developed character because he fits with the other characters created by Gen Urobuchi, especially Akane Tsunemori. Kila from Sequential Planet noted that the usage of new protagonists was a risky move for the franchise due to the popularity of Kogami and Tsunemori. Nevertheless, she believed that both Shindo and Ignatov were likable characters, enjoying the former the most for how his cheerful personality stood in high contrast to the dark narrative. Due to the focus the duo is given, the reviewer believed Shindo and Ignatov managed to be Kogami and Tsunemori's successors. Shindo and Ignatov's roles were praised by TheCinemaHolic due to how they fit within the supporting characters and brief elements from the past lives imply further depths such as the latter being a victim of xenophobia. Shindo was also praised by Anime News Network because his mentalist skill adds a new element to investigation and gives the series an air of mystery. 

There was comment in regards to the anime's ending. Although Anime News Network was disappointed by the lack of closure for the returning cast, the focus given on Shindo and Ignatov earned positive responses for the build up they are given in terms or not whether they will betray one another. As Ignatov is the primary subject of this, the website claims he has a bigger character arc than his best friend. Since the television series ends on a cliffhanger there were multiple mysteries in regards to the cast that website Comic Book Resources look forward to be resolved in First Inspector. The Cinema Holic was more critical, finding the experience "incomplete" as a result of the narrative not reaching a proper ending and relying on the movie sequel.

The series also won the "Best Mechanical Design" award from Newtype.

References

External links 
  
 

2019 anime television series debuts
2019 Japanese television seasons
Psycho-Pass
Crime in anime and manga
Cyberpunk anime and manga
Japanese webcomics
Noitamina
Shōnen manga
Shueisha manga
Television series set in the 22nd century
Television shows set in Japan
Webcomics in print